Ma Shucheng (1891 – 23 June 1966) was a Chinese educator and politician. She was among the first group of women elected to the Legislative Yuan in 1948.

Biography
Originally from Chengdu in Sichuan Province, Ma attended Sichuan Second Class Girls' School and
Sichuan Sericulture Middle School, before graduating from Peking Girls' Normal School. She became a teacher and served as director of school discipline and education at Heilongjiang Girls' Middle School. She married Ma Fuxiang, a military leader and politician.

In the 1948 elections to the Legislative Yuan, Ma was a Kuomintang candidate in Ningxia Province and was elected to parliament. She died in 1966.

References

1891 births
Chinese schoolteachers
Members of the Kuomintang
20th-century Chinese women politicians
Members of the 1st Legislative Yuan
Members of the 1st Legislative Yuan in Taiwan
1966 deaths